This list of Ramsar sites in England includes wetlands that are considered to be of international importance under the Ramsar Convention. England currently has 71 sites designated as "Wetlands of International Importance". For a full list of all Ramsar sites worldwide, see List of Ramsar wetlands of international importance.

List of Ramsar Sites

See also
 Ramsar Convention
 List of Ramsar sites worldwide

References



 
England
Ramsar
Ramsar